Gregory John Mahlberg (born August 8, 1952) is an American former professional baseball catcher, manager and coach.

Mahlberg attended Wisconsin Lutheran High School in Milwaukee and the University of Wisconsin–Madison. His lone Major League home run  came off left-hander Floyd Bannister on September 3, 1979. As a minor leaguer, he batted .241 in 705 games spread over ten seasons (1973–82).

He began his managing career in the Seattle Mariners farm system in 1983, and spent 15 years as a minor league pilot, also working for the Chicago Cubs, Milwaukee Brewers and Tampa Bay Devil Rays. His career record was 904 victories, 1,050 defeats (.463).

References

1952 births
Living people
Baseball players from Milwaukee
Charleston Charlies players
Gulf Coast Rangers players
Indianapolis Indians players
Lynn Sailors players
Major League Baseball catchers
Texas Rangers players
Pittsfield Rangers players
Rocky Mount Phillies players
Minor league baseball managers
Tucson Toros players
University of Wisconsin–Milwaukee alumni